Executive Decisions is the debut solo album by American rapper and producer Big Hutch, who also known as Cold 187um of Pomona-based hip hop group Above The Law. It was released on June 29, 1999 via Street Solid Records. The sixteen track full-length album featured guest appearances from Xzibit, Saafir, KM.G, Tha Chill, Safecracka, Ha-Ha L.O.C., Young Ten, Hazmad, and Boom Bam.

The song "Gangsta Shit" was later featured in the 2001 film Gang Tapes.

Critical response

Alex Henderson of AllMusic wrote:

So Hutch's solo debut isn't groundbreaking, but even so, the MC is clever and entertaining enough to hold your attention. Dark, twisted humor was always one of Hutch's strong points, and there's no shortage of it on Executive Decisions -- much like Martin Scorsese's Goodfellas or Quentin Tarantino's Pulp Fiction, this CD is amusing and disturbing at the same time. And musically, Executive Decisions is easy to admire.

Track listing

Personnel 
 Gregory Fernan Hutchinson - main artist, producer (tracks 2, 6, 10, 13-14), co-producer (track 9), mixing (tracks 2, 10, 11, 14), recording (tracks 4, 10, 11)
 Big Mil - producer (tracks 2-3, 8-9, 11-13), mixing (tracks 3, 8-9, 11, 12, 13), recording (tracks 2, 4, 6, 8-9, 11, 12-13)
 Tim House - recording (tracks  1, 4, 6, 11, 14)
 Aaron - producer (tracks 7, 15), mixing & recording (tracks 7. 15)
 Russell Brown - producer (track 1), mixing (track 6)
 Vernon Johnson - featured artist & producer (track 5), mixing & recording (track 5)
 The S.O.C. - mixing & producer (track 4)
 Nick - mixing & recording (track 5)
 Kathy Longinaker - photography
 Ken Hollis - photography
 Boom Bam - featured artist (tracks 4, 7, 11, 15)
 Kevin Michael Gulley - featured artist (track 5-6, 15)
 Ha-Ha L.O.C. - featured artist (track 4)
 Alvin Nathaniel Joiner - featured artist (track 6)
 Safecracka - featured artist (track 8)
 Young Ten - featured artist (track 11)
 Reggie Gibson - featured artist (track 12)
 Hazmad - featured artist (track 14)

References

1999 debut albums
Cold 187um albums